Maksym "Max" Polyakov (born 30 June 1977) is an international technology entrepreneur, investor, economist, and philanthropist. Polyakov is a general partner in the venture fund Noosphere Ventures Partners LP which invests in a number of technology companies over the global scale. 

Polyakov has a business philosophy with deep scientific roots. He follows the idea of Ukrainian scientist Volodymyr Vernadsky who claimed that knowledge is the driving force behind every further positive development on Earth. Polyakov believes that space-based technologies can and should be used to solve problems on Earth.

Education 
Maksym "Max" Polyakov was born in Zaporizhzhia, Ukraine. In high school, Polyakov won competitions in math and physics, then scholarships. In 2001, Polyakov graduated from Zaporizhzhia State Medical University as an obstetrician-gynecologist. 

In 2013, Polyakov was awarded a Ph.D. in International Economics and in 2019, earned a Doctor of Economic Sciences.

He is a co-author of philosophical and scientific works on noospherology, semiotics, and innovation in economics.

Max Polyakov owns 18 patents.

Business 

While studying at the university, Polyakov launched his first software outsourcing business. Following the success of his first venture, he set up a number of successful tech businesses.

Polyakov co-founded the IDE Group which included the companies Cupid, Murka, HitDynamics and Maxymiser in 2005. Polyakov took Cupid public on the London Stock Exchange in 2010 and became the first Ukrainian entrepreneur to have a tech company listed on the London Stock Exchange. In 2015, Polyakov’s startup Maxymiser was bought by the American corporation Oracle. Blackstone bought out Murka project group in 2019.

Currently, Max focuses on the space industry in an attempt to build a vertically integrated holding company type through Noosphere Ventures asset management firm. The goal is to unite a whole cycle of space mission development to enable fast and affordable access to space.

Noosphere Ventures 
In 2014, Polyakov founded Noosphere Ventures, an international asset management firm dedicated to the development of space technology. The same year, Polyakov created Noosphere Engineering School (NES). Noosphere Ventures hosted the 2016 FAI World Championships for Space Models in Ukraine. Noosphere Ventures portfolio includes D-Orbit, a global provider of space logistic services, and electric rocket propulsion developer Space Electric Thruster Systems (SETS). In 2018, the SETS team was awarded the Seal of Excellence Certificate by the European Commission as part of the Horizon 2020 Research and Innovation Programme. Flight Control, liquid rocket engines manufacturer, also belongs to Noosphere Ventures portfolio.

EOS DATA Analytics 
In 2015, Polyakov's Noosphere Ventures created EOS DATA Analytics, a company for processing and analyzing satellite data. Four years later, EOS implemented the World Bank partnered with the EU to launch a project on satellite-based monitoring of agricultural land use. EOS DATA Analytics also partnered with the €10 million Goldeneye Project will run real time monitoring of five mines in Europe (Bulgaria, Finland, Germany, Kosovo and Romania) to improve safety, environmental impact, and mine profitability by creating a platform that combines Earth observation technologies with on-site sensing. In October 2021, Dragonfly Aerospace has announced an agreement with EOS Data Analytics (EOSDA) to use its new 100kg class µDragonfly satellite bus. The agreement will see EOSDA use the satellite bus as the platform for the two DragonEye electro-optical imagers.

Firefly Aerospace 

Polyakov's Noosphere Ventures acquired assets of Firefly Space Systems and later launched a new company keeping the original Firefly brand in 2017. By May 2018, a Firefly research and development center was opened in Polyakov's hometown of Dnipro, Ukraine. In November of the same year, Firefly Aerospace entered the list of companies selected by NASA for its lunar exploration program with a total budget of $2.6 billion.

In 2019, the U.S. Air Force selected Firefly to participate in the Orbital Services Program-4 (OSP-4) along with Rocketdyne. In 2021, NASA awarded Firefly a $93.3 million to deliver a suite of 10 science investigations and technology demonstrations to the Moon in 2023. Firefly The team successfully performed pre-flight of their alpha rocket in September 2020. On May 4, 2021, CBInsights listed Firefly Aerospace as a 'unicorn' startup having achieved $1 billion valuation.  Firefly expected to make a second Alpha launch attempt in early 2022, but the flight is delayed.  In August 2021, Firefly Aerospace has hired Lauren Lyons, a former SpaceX and Blue Origin engineer, as its new chief operating officer. Astra, the small launch company that recently went public, has signed a roughly $30 million deal for the rights to manufacture Firefly Aerospace’s Reaver rocket engines in-house. In October 2021, Firefly Aerospace announced that it has completed NASA’s Critical Design Review (CDR) of its Blue Ghost lunar lander.

On September 3, 2021, a two-stage orbital expendable launch vehicle Firefly Alpha exploded (because of deliberate mission termination) a few minutes after launch from the Vandenberg Space Force Base in California. On October 1, 2022, Firefly Alpha successfully reached orbit for the first time. Firefly Aerospace had raised $75 million to prepare for this launch.

On February 24, 2022, it was announced that Polyakov and his company Noosphere will sell their stake in Firefly to AE Industrial Partners.

Dragonfly Aerospace 
In April 2021, Max Polyakov bought majority stake in Dragonfly Aerospace, a South African satellite engineering company. Dragonfly team has more than 20 years of experience in imaging satellites and payloads, mainly through the high-resolution cameras that it builds. Dragonfly develops satellite cameras for Earth Observing Systems Data Analytics. The products of Dragonfly include CubeSat cameras (Gecko, Mantis, Chameleon and Caiman) with resolution up to 5 meters and cameras for microsatellites (HR-250 and Raptor). The company currently focuses on providing cameras to Europe and other markets outside the United States. Customers include satellite makers NanoAvionics and Loft Orbital, as well as Indian hyper spectral imaging startup Pixxel. The company said in October that it will build two satellite cameras for EOSDA’s first satellite, a crop-monitoring spacecraft slated to launch in 2022.

Philanthropy 
In 2016, Polyakov created the non-profit organization Noosphere Association, which organizes  STEM events such as BestRoboFest robotics festival and the Noosphere Vernadsky Challenge engineering startup competition. Noosphere Ventures hosted the 2016 FAI World Championships for Space Models in Ukraine. On June 7, 2021, Noosphere Ventures co-sponsored the 11th Annual Space Foundation Student Art Contest. Since 2017, Noosphere Association has sponsored and supported the NASA Space Apps Challenge in Dnipro.

In March 2022, Polyakov along with EOS Data Analytics appealed to the global remote sensing firms and organizations to provide real-time SAR data to support the Armed Forces of Ukraine with actionable intelligence. As the war in Ukraine unfolded, he donated over 100 million UAH to the “Army of drones” project and a significant donation to Serhiy Prytula Charity Foundation. In August 2022 when a Ukrainian charity organization decided to purchase an SAR satellite for the crowdfunded money to cater for the needs of the military, they turned to Max Polyakov for his expertise in the space industry. The purchased satellite has already strongly helped in the battlefield, according to Ukrainian Ministry of Defence.

Controversies 
A two-year study by the fact-checking web site "Snopes" led to an investigation by the BBC and Kyiv Post to show that before working in the space industry, Max Polyakov made his fortune from dating sites.  Noosphere Ventures released a statement refuting Snopes investigation claiming that Max Polyakov had left the company in 2012 and connecting publication of the material with a lawsuit filed by former Firefly Systems investors. In December 2021, the U.S. government requested Max Polyakov to sell his stake in the rocket company Firefly Aerospace Inc. due to national security concerns, despite all the pre-caution measures taken by the management earlier and no prior questions to ownership. On February 24, 2022, it was announced that Polyakov and his company Noosphere will sell their stake in Firefly to AE Industrial Partners.

Personal life 
Polyakov moved to Silicon Valley where he co-founded the venture capital fund Noosphere Venture Partners in 2012.  In 2021, Polyakov moved to Edinburgh, Scotland. In one of the interviews, Polyakov was described as “A lightning-fast talker with a rugby player’s build and a salesman’s disposition.”

Family 
Max Polyakov is married with four children.

Polyakov’s father Valeriy wrote operating system software for Soviet space rockets. His mother developed hardware systems meant to make the rockets reusable.

References

Living people
Businesspeople from Zaporizhzhia
1977 births
Businesspeople in technology